Events from the year 1872 in Germany.

Incumbents

National level
 Kaiser – William I
 Chancellor – Otto von Bismarck

State level

Kingdoms
 King of Bavaria – Ludwig II of Bavaria
 King of Prussia – Kaiser William I
 King of Saxony – John of Saxony
 King of Württemberg – Charles of Württemberg

Grand Duchies
 Grand Duke of Baden – Frederick I
 Grand Duke of Hesse – Louis III
 Grand Duke of Mecklenburg-Schwerin – Frederick Francis II
 Grand Duke of Mecklenburg-Strelitz – Frederick William
 Grand Duke of Oldenburg – Peter II
 Grand Duke of Saxe-Weimar-Eisenach – Charles Alexander

Principalities
 Schaumburg-Lippe – Adolf I, Prince of Schaumburg-Lippe
 Schwarzburg-Rudolstadt – George Albert, Prince of Schwarzburg-Rudolstadt
 Schwarzburg-Sondershausen – Günther Friedrich Karl II, Prince of Schwarzburg-Sondershausen
 Principality of Lippe – Leopold III, Prince of Lippe
 Reuss Elder Line – Heinrich XXII, Prince Reuss of Greiz
 Reuss Younger Line – Heinrich XIV, Prince Reuss Younger Line
 Waldeck and Pyrmont – George Victor, Prince of Waldeck and Pyrmont

Duchies
 Duke of Anhalt – Frederick I, Duke of Anhalt
 Duke of Brunswick – William, Duke of Brunswick
 Duke of Saxe-Altenburg – Ernst I, Duke of Saxe-Altenburg
 Duke of Saxe-Coburg and Gotha – Ernest II, Duke of Saxe-Coburg and Gotha
 Duke of Saxe-Meiningen – Georg II, Duke of Saxe-Meiningen

Events
 4 July – Jesuits Law is promulgated
 12 November – Dresdner Bank is founded

Science
 Richard Dedekind publishes Stetigkeit und irrationale Zahlen, a theory of irrational numbers.
 Felix Klein produces the Erlangen program on geometries.
 Ludwig Boltzmann states the Boltzmann equation for the temporal development of distribution functions in phase space, and publishes his H-theorem.
 Polyvinyl chloride is accidentally synthesised by German chemist Eugen Baumann.

Undated
 Radeberger Brewery is opened

Births

 11 January – Paul Graener, German composer and conductor (died 1944)
 28 January – Otto Braun, German politician (died 1955)
 8 February – Theodor Lessing, German philosopher (died 1933)
 24 March – Walther Reinhardt, Army officer (died 1930)
 1 April – Conrad Gröber, German bishop of Roman-Catholic Church (died 1948)
 9 April – Theodor Koch-Grunberg, German ethnologue and explorer (died 1924)
 19 April – Alice Salomon, German social reformer (died 1948)
 22 April – Princess Margaret of Prussia, Prussian princess (died 1954)
 2 May – Karl Nessler, German inventor of the permanent wave (died 1951)
 14 June – Heinrich Vogeler, German painter (died 1942)
 22 July – Karl Helfferich, German politician (died 1924)
 13 August – Richard Willstätter, German chemist, Nobel Prize laureate (died 1942)
 5 September – Carl Friedrich von Siemens, German entrepreneur (died 1941)
 3 October – Hermann Anschütz-Kaempfe, German scientist and inventor (died 1931)
 9 November – Richard Otto, German physician (died 1952)
 11 November – Frederick Stock, German composer (died 1942)

Deaths

 1 April – Hugo von Mohl, German botanist (born 1805)
 13 May – Moritz Hartmann, German poet and author (born 1821)
 24 May – Julius Schnorr von Carolsfeld, German painter (born 1794)
 21 August – David Kalisch, German playwright and humorist (born 1820)
 13 September – Ludwig Feuerbach, German philosopher and anthropologist (born 1804)
 14 October – Prince Albert of Prussia, German nobleman and Prussian general (born 1809)

References

 
Years of the 19th century in Germany
Germany
Germany